John Tayloe may refer to:

John Tayloe I (1688–1747), plantation owner and businessmen in Virginia
John Tayloe II (1721–1779), plantation owner in Virginia
John Tayloe III (1770–1828), Virginia, businessman

See also
John Tayloe Lomax (1781–1862), American jurist